Danville is a town in Twiggs and Wilkinson counties in the U.S. state of Georgia. The population was 238 at the 2010 census, down from 373 in 2000.

The Twiggs County portion of Danville is part of the Macon Metropolitan Statistical Area.

History
Danville was originally called "Hughes", and under that name had its start about 1891 when the railroad was extended to that point. The Georgia General Assembly incorporated the place in 1905 as the "Town of Danville". The town was named for Daniel G. Hughes, father of U.S. Representative Dudley Mays Hughes.

Geography

Danville is located at  (32.605607, -83.244762).

Interstate 16 runs northwest to southeast just south of town, leading southeast 137 mi (220 km) to Savannah and northwest 31 mi (50 km) to Macon. The town is also traversed by U.S. Route 80 and Georgia State Route 358.

Demographics

As of the census of 2000, there were 373 people, 141 households, and 97 families residing in the town. The racial makeup of the town was 47.45% White, 51.21% African American, 0.80% Native American, and 0.54% from two or more races.

There were 141 households, out of which 27.7% had children under the age of 18 living with them, 40.4% were married couples living together, 23.4% had a female householder with no husband present, and 31.2% were non-families. 27.7% of all households were made up of individuals, and 9.9% had someone living alone who was 65 years of age or older.  The average household size was 2.65 and the average family size was 3.28.

In the town, the population was spread out, with 26.5% under the age of 18, 9.7% from 18 to 24, 25.2% from 25 to 44, 23.9% from 45 to 64, and 14.7% who were 65 years of age or older.  The median age was 35 years. For every 100 females, there were 77.6 males.  For every 100 females age 18 and over, there were 75.6 males.

The median income for a household in the town was $28,036, and the median income for a family was $33,214. Males had a median income of $30,375 versus $17,500 for females. The per capita income for the town was $12,281.  About 15.2% of families and 21.8% of the population were below the poverty line, including 19.8% of those under age 18 and 20.8% of those age 65 or over.

References

 

Towns in Georgia (U.S. state)
Towns in Twiggs County, Georgia
Towns in Wilkinson County, Georgia
Macon metropolitan area, Georgia